The 25th ceremony of the Forqué Awards was held on 11 January 2020 at the Palacio Municipal de Congresos in Madrid. The gala was hosted by Elena S. Sánchez and Santiago Segura.

History 
The nominations were disclosed in November 2019. Organised by EGEDA, the awards had the participation of the Ayuntamiento de Madrid, the Community of Madrid and RTVE, and the collaboration of Ibercaja, Mercedes Benz, ICAA, L'Oréal, AISGE, FIPCA, Alta Pavina and Cornejo.

The ceremony was hosted at the Madrid's Palacio Municipal de Congresos on 11 January 2020. The gala featured musical performances by Los Secretos, Antonio José, Ana Mena, Ángela Carrasco and Paco Arrojo. It was hosted by Elena S. Sánchez and Santiago Segura.

Gonzalo Suárez was gifted the EGEDA Gold Medal recognizing a career in the film industry whereas Pan's Labyrinth was recognised as the best Spanish film of the last 25 years over The Lucky Star, Marshland, Solas and Tesis.

Winners and nominees
The winners and nominees are listed as follows:

References

External links 
 Gala of the 25th Forqué Awards on RTVE Play

Forqué Awards
2020 film awards
2020 in Madrid
January 2020 events in Spain